San Juan del Río, Durango is a town and seat of the municipality of San Juan del Río, in the state of Durango, north-western Mexico. As of 2010, the town had a population of 2,912.

San Juan del Río was the birthplace of journalist and poet Juana Belén Gutiérrez de Mendoza, an anarchist feminist activist and critic of the Díaz regime during the Mexican Revolution.

Web Site 
Website

References

Populated places in Durango